A fork is a utensil for eating and cooking.

Fork may also refer to:

Implements
 Fork (road), a type of intersection where a road splits
 Bicycle fork, the part of a bicycle to which the front wheel is attached
 Garden fork, a pronged gardening tool designed for digging
 Military fork, a pole weapon used between the 15th and 19th centuries
 Motorcycle fork, the portion of a motorcycle that holds the front wheel
 Pitchfork, a tined farming tool used to lift and pitch hay and perform other tasks
 Tuning fork, a vibrating device used to tune musical instruments
 Winnowing fork, a tined farming tool used to separate grain and chaff

Places
 Fork, Iran (disambiguation), several places in Iran
 Fork, Maryland, United States, a town
 Fork Township (disambiguation), several districts in the United States

Computing
 Fork (file system), a part of a file in certain filesystems
 Fork (software development), when a piece of software or other work is split into two branches or variations of development
 Fork (system call), the method whereby a running process creates a new process
 Fork (blockchain), a split of the blockchain into two chains or a protocol change
 The Fork, an on-line restaurant booking system

Other uses
 Fork (chess), a situation in chess where one piece simultaneously attacks two or more opposing pieces
 Operation Fork, the invasion of Iceland by the British during World War II
 Fork, in the United States a tributary of a river or other stream

See also
 Forks (disambiguation)
 The Forks (disambiguation)
 Forq
 Furca (disambiguation) ("fork" in Latin)